Nikola Štrkalj (born 4 February 1998) is a Croatian water polo player. He is currently playing for VK Solaris. He is 6 ft 8 in (2.03 m) tall and weighs 231 lb (105 kg).

References

External links

ĆAKULA UZ BAZEN Nikola Štrkalj, dvadesetogodišnji vaterpolist Solarisa, bek je koji zna zabijati, ali i obavljati one prljavije, pomalo podmukle poslove ispod vode

1998 births
Living people
Croatian male water polo players
Sportspeople from Šibenik